Rónald Mora Padilla (born 18 July 1961) is a retired Costa Rican football player who played most of his career with Deportivo Saprissa, during the 1980s, as well as Alajuelense and Carmelita.

Club career
He won one national championship with Saprissa and one CONCACAF Champions Cup with Alajuelense. Nicknamed El Macho, he is remembered for being a very tough defender.

Managerial career
He began a career in coaching upon retiring, starting with Carmelita in 1993 and has coached teams such as Limonense, Santos de Guápiles (twice), Liberia Mía, Santa Bárbara, Herediano (twice), Cartaginés, Municipal Grecia and Limón, of Costa Rica's first division. He reached the local finals with Santos de Guápiles and Herediano, and lost both to the teams that he played for when active, while with Santos with Alajuelense and when coaching Herediano with Saprissa. In October 2012, he was fired by Puntarenas. In September 2013 he left Guatemalan side Deportivo Ayutla and took charge at second division Siquirreña.

In July 2014, Mora was dismissed as coach of the Costa Rica U-20 football team after taking the reins in November 2013.

As a coach, he discovered future stars, such as Andy Herron, Kurt Bernard, Adrián De Lemos, among others.

References 

1961 births
Living people
People from San José Province
Association football defenders
Costa Rican footballers
Deportivo Saprissa players
L.D. Alajuelense footballers
A.D. Carmelita footballers
Costa Rican football managers
C.S. Herediano managers
Puntarenas F.C. managers
Liga FPD players
Deportivo Ayutla managers
Municipal Grecia managers